Robert Lannoy (18 June 1915 – June 1979) was a French composer, second Prize of the Prix de Rome in 1946. He was then director of the Conservatoire de Lille for 33 years, until his death.

Life 
Born in Saint-Amand-les-Eaux, Nord department of France in a family of carillonneurs, Lannoy was quickly introduced to the bell tradition. He began his musical studies at the Conservatory of Valenciennes where he studied harmony, violin and bassoon with master Fernand Lamy.

He was accepted at the Conservatoire de Paris and obtained the supreme awards in the writing classes.

He presented himself in vain for the first time for the Prix de Rome in 1938. During his studies at the conservatory, he was also a soldier-musician in the 5th Line Infantry Regiment of Courbevoie.

Lannoy was taken prisoner at the beginning of the Second World War and remained so for 5 years despite a few escapes. Sent to Czechoslovakia, he escaped but could not resist visiting Bayreuth, the city of Wagner and was retaken. Sent to Ukraine, in the disciplinary camp of Rawa Ruska, he attempted another escape in 1942, which led to his internment at the citadel of Lemberg.

Then sent to Austria in 1943 in a Stalag, he was appointed Kapellmeister and organized orchestras, choirs and even a ballet-mime, Pygmalion, played by prisoners in Poland.

Freed by the American army, he returned to Paris in 1945. At the request of the Americans, he composed the music for the documentary film Homecoming, recounting the return of prisoners after the Second World War and directed by Henri Cartier-Bresson.

For the radio, and at the request of Henri Dutilleux, he composed La légende des pays alliés by Louise de Vilmorin

He competed again for the Prix de Rome in 1946 and obtained a second major prize, which earned him the position of director of the Conservatoire de Lille.

It was during this period that he married pianist Lola Delwarde, who had a brilliant career as a concert pianist. He conducted many concerts and introduced a whole generation of Lille students to music.

Lannoy died in Lille in June 1979.

Works

Chamber music 
 Wind Quintet - (2 bassoons) - 1936
 Wind Quintet Sinfonietta - 1946
 String quartet Lamento
 Piece for harp and string quartet - Mort de Roger Salengro
 Deux virelais du Moyen âge - Soprano, flute, clarinet and viola - 1944
 Ballade de l'épinette amoureuse - Four female voices, oboe, English horn, Bb clarinet and bassoon - 1937

Voice

Voice and piano 
 Il pleut doucement sur la ville - Concerto grosso - juin 1932
 Tristesse de banlieue - Concours des Rosatis - 1934
 Vision de Saül - March 1939
 2 melodies on a poem by Francis Carco - 1941
 Song for soprano and piano - text by Maeterlinck - May 1946
 Vocalise for soprano and piano - June 1951
 Aimer - voix et piano - poem by Victor Hugo
 Chanson de Silvio - voice and piano
 Danièle, fille de Dieu - voice and instrumental ensemble - October 1952

Choir 
 Pierrot gamin - choir with 4 mixed voices and piano - text by Verlaine - 1938
 Esquisse de soir de bataille - choir and orchestra or 2 pianos on a text by José-Maria de Heredia - 1939
 Pleine nuit (esquisse) - choir and orchestra - Courbevoie - 1939
 Le soir devant Sybaris - choir and orchestra - 1939
 Hortense, couches-toi - piano and men's choir after Courteline - September 1941
 Arrangements for choir and orchestra of L'amour de moy, Marche des soldats de Turenne, Roule donc, J'aimerai bien apprendre au monde - Camp de Rawa - Ruska - 1942
 Chant des déportés (arrangement and orchestration) - 1943
 Le jeu de l'amour et du hasard - one-act cantata - 1st Second Grand Prix de Rome - June 1946
 Les prophéties - oratorio for narrator, choir and orchestra (commissioned by the State) - April 1961
 Sanctus - male voices and organ for the Choral of the XXX - Wormhout - August 1973
 Sanctus - mixed choir and pipe organ

Operetta 
 Farce du mari fondu

Orchestra 
 Concerto grosso - January 1938 - for string orchestra and timpani
 Cantilène et danse pastorale - Christmas 1943 - for orchestra ( captivity in Austria)
 Le Retour - January 1945 - Music for Henri Cartier-Bresson's film - Released in Paris on January 24, 1946 at the Champs-Élysées cinema. He made a symphonic suite of it in January 1954.
 Lamento ukrainien - Christmas 1948 - State commission - A version for string quartet and a version for chamber orchestra and timpani.
 Campanile - February 1951 - Prelude for orchestra 
 Le Roman de la rose - March 1951 - Ballet mime for chamber orchestra (Mont Cassel)
 Les Prophéties - April 1961 - State commission - Oratorio for narrator, choir and symphony orchestra.

Music for chimes 
 Ballet des petits canards
 Prélude N°1
 Prélude N°2

External links 
 Official website
 Robert Lannoy (Musica et Memoria)
 Notice
 Discography (Discogs)
 Biography (musiques-regenerees.fr) 

1915 births
1979 deaths
20th-century French composers
20th-century French male musicians
Carillonneurs
Conservatoire de Paris alumni
French classical composers
French male classical composers
French prisoners of war in World War II
People from Nord (French department)
Prix de Rome for composition
Recipients of the Resistance Medal